This is a list of the U.S. Billboard magazine Hot 100 number-ones of 1991. The longest running number-one single of 1991 is "(Everything I Do) I Do It for You" by Bryan Adams, which attained seven weeks at number-one. ("Black or White" by Michael Jackson would also spend a total of seven weeks at #1, but only four of those weeks were in the 1991 calendar year.)

That year, 14 acts earn their first number one song, such as Surface, C+C Music Factory, Freedom Williams, Timmy T, Londonbeat, Hi-Five, Extreme, EMF, Color Me Badd, Marky Mark and the Funky Bunch, Loleatta Holloway, Karyn White, The New Power Generation, and P.M. Dawn. Mariah Carey and Paula Abdul were the only acts to hit number one more than once, with Mariah Carey having the most with three and Paula Abdul having two.

The November 30 chart ("Set Adrift on Memory Bliss") was the first Hot 100 to be compiled with Soundscan data.

Chart history

Number-one artists

See also
1991 in music
List of Cash Box Top 100 number-one singles of 1991
List of Billboard number-one singles

References

Additional sources
Fred Bronson's Billboard Book of Number 1 Hits, 5th Edition
Joel Whitburn's Top Pop Singles 1955-2008, 12 Edition
Joel Whitburn Presents the Billboard Hot 100 Charts: The Nineties
Additional information obtained can be verified within Billboard's online archive services and print editions of the magazine.

United States Hot 100
1991